Manning Warren is the current holder of the H. Edward Harter Chair of Commercial Law at the University of Louisville, Louisville, Kentucky, and is one of the leading scholars on corporate and securities law in the United States and the European Union.

Biography

Warren was named the H. Edward Harter Chair of Commercial Law at the University of Louisville School of Law in 1990.

He is a leading authority on securities and financial services law in both the U.S. and the European Union, having authored or co-authored over 40 articles and 10 books, including Business Enterprises: Legal Structures, Governance and Policy, a widely-adopted textbook now in its fourth edition, and European Securities Regulation.  He has testified on market regulation before the U.S. Senate Banking Committee and has served as a consultant to the London Stock Exchange and the North American Securities Administrators Association and its member state regulatory agencies.  He has served on the U.S. Securities and Exchange Commission's Federal Advisory Committee on Market Transactions, and on the Board of Directors of the American Judicature Society. He is a Life Member of the American Law Institute and a Fellow of the European Law Institute.

Before his current position at the University of Louisville, Warren was Senior Fulbright Scholar and Visiting Professor at Queen Mary College, University of London; Visiting Professor of Law at the George Washington University, Emory University, and the University of Arizona; and Professor of Law at the University of Alabama.

Prior to his academic career, he was a partner at Ritchie, Rediker & Warren and an associate at Bradley, Arant, Rose & White, both in Birmingham, Alabama, where he engaged in both general corporate and securities practice and securities litigation.

Before entering practice, Warren served as Law Clerk to U.S. District Judge Seybourn Harris Lynne, former Chief Judge of the Northern District of Alabama.

Throughout his career, Warren has been a volunteer leader in the International Red Cross movement.  He was founder and director of Friendship Guatemala, an American Red Cross volunteer medical training program in Guatemala.  He served on the Group of Experts on Human Rights, Commission on the Red Cross and Peace, Geneva, Switzerland, and as Delegate to the XXVth (Geneva) and XXVIth (Budapest) International Conferences of the Red Cross and Red Crescent Movement.  He also served on the American Red Cross Board of Governors International Services Committee, as Senior International Advisor to the American Red Cross, and as Chair of the American Red Cross Committee on Magen David Adom.  He has acted as the American Red Cross' Special Counsel for International Affairs in connection with the Union Carbide disaster in Bhopal, India and the Ethiopia-Sudan famine in Addis Ababa, Ethiopia.  He has also served as Chair of the Board of Directors, Kentucky Region, American Red Cross.

Warren has served as President of the Louisville Orchestra in Louisville, Kentucky. Under his leadership, the Louisville Orchestra narrowly avoided bankruptcy through his renegotiation of the orchestra's union contract in coordination with the American Federation of Musicians. In addition, he served for four years as President of the Birmingham Area Legal Services Corporation in Birmingham, Alabama.

As a student, Warren served as chair of the University of Alabama Homecoming Pageant, an event that brought national coverage by the major television networks. As the event's producer, Warren selected a panel of judges, led by former Alabama Governor James "Big Jim" Folsom, which selected the first African American woman, Dianne Kirksey; the first Asian American woman, Sue Shimoda; and Karen Parvin to the three-member Homecoming Court.

Warren received his Bachelor of Arts degree in International studies from the University of Alabama and his Juris Doctor, with honors, from the National Law Center, George Washington University. As a student, he was elected to Omicron Delta Kappa, Pi Sigma Alpha, and Who's Who Among Students in American Colleges and Universities. He also became a member of Sigma Alpha Epsilon social fraternity.

He is an active member of the District of Columbia, Alabama and Kentucky Bar Associations.

Publications

Books
	Business Enterprises: Legal Structures, Governance and Policy, 4th Ed. (LexisNexis/ Carolina Academic Press 2020) (with D. Branson, J. Heminway, M. Loewenstein and M. Steinberg)
	European Securities Regulation (Kluwer 2003)
	Southeast Litigation Guide (Matthew Bender & Co. 1981-93) (with S. Smith and B. Colson)

Selected Articles
	'Notice Requirement in Administrative Rulemaking' (1977) Administrative Law Review
	'A Review of Regulation D' (1984) American University Law Review
	'Reflections on Dual Regulation of Securities' (1984) Boston College Law Review
'State Takeover Legislation' (1985) Business Lawyer
	'The Marketplace Exemption from State Securities Registration' (1986) Business Lawyer
	'The Role of Merit Regulation' (1987) Brooklyn Law Review
	'A Commentary on Investment Bankers and the Misappropriation Theory (1987) Maryland Law Review
'A Foreword on Insider Trading Regulation' (1988) Alabama Law Review
	'One Share, One Vote' (1988) Journal of Corporation Law
	'The Common Market Prospectus' (1990) Common Market Law Review
	'The Global Harmonization of Securities Laws' (1990) Harvard International Law Journal
'The Treatment of Notes as Securities' (1991) Business Lawyer
	'The Regulation of Insider Trading in the European Community' (1991) Washington & Lee Law Review
	'The European Union's Investment Services Directive' (1994) University of Pennsylvania Journal of Business Law
	'The Primary Liability of Securities Lawyers' (1996) Southern Methodist University Law Review
	'Federalism and Investor Protection' (1998) Duke Journal of Law and Contemporary Problems
	'Dual Regulation of Securities: A Case for Reallocation' (2000) Washington University Law Quarterly
	'Harmonization of European Securities Law' (2003) International Lawyer
	'Revenue Recognition and Corporate Counsel' (2003) Southern Methodist University Law Review
	'An Essay on Rule 506 of Regulation D' (2010) Securities Regulation Law Journal
	'Equitable Clawback' (2010) University of Pennsylvania Journal of Business Law
	'U.S. Securities Fraud Class Action: An Unlikely Export to the European Union' (2012) Brooklyn Journal of International Law
       'The Prospects for Convergence of Collective Redress Remedies in the European Union' (2014) The International Lawyer
       'The Role of the States in the Regulation of Private Placements' (2014) Kentucky Law Journal
       'The False Promise of Publicly Offered Private Placements' (2015) Southern Methodist University Law Review
       'The Regulatory Vortex for Private Placements' (2017) Securities Regulation Law Journal
       'The Deconstruction of the Administrative Judiciary' (2018) Securities Regulation Law Journal
       'A Birthday Toast to Texas Gulf Sulphur''' (2018) Southern Methodist University Law Review       'The Common Law Fiduciary Duties of Business Owners' (2020) University of Louisville Law Review'' (with E. Penn)

References
 
 
 Apple's America: The Discriminating Traveler's Guide to 40 Great Cities by R. W. Apple, Jr. - 2007 - Travel

External links
 Poetry by Manning Warren

Living people
Date of birth missing (living people)
University of Louisville faculty
University of Alabama alumni
George Washington University Law School alumni
Kentucky lawyers
American male writers
Year of birth missing (living people)